EuroBancshares, Inc. (commonly known as Eurobank) was a financial holding company located in San Juan, Puerto Rico. On April 30, 2010, the bank failed and its deposits and assets were seized by the Federal Deposit Insurance Corporation (FDIC). Its deposits and assets were subsequently sold to Oriental Bank and Trust.

EuroBank used to offer financial and insurance services in Puerto Rico through its wholly owned subsidiaries Eurobank Puerto Rico and EuroSeguros, respectively. Founded on December 4, 1979, under the name of Española de Finanzas Trust Company, it grew into a billion dollar financial institution, eventually operating through a network of 21 branches in 2005. Its headquarters were located at 270 Muñoz Rivera Avenue, near the Golden Mile District or "Milla de Oro" of Hato Rey, San Juan.

Summary

Over the years, the name of the institution changed on various occasions. In 1988, after 9 years of operating under the name Española de Finanzas Trust Company, its name was changed to First Community Trust Company. In 1990, following the change in business strategy to lending activities focused on lines of credit to businesses and business loans to individuals of high net worth, the company changed its name to Eurobank & Trust Company. The company changed its name to EuroBancshares shortly thereafter. In view of the rapidly expanding residential home mortgage market in Puerto Rico, Eurobank established a Mortgage Division in late quarter 1999. However, after the late 2000s financial crisis occurred, the company suffered adversely, and on April 30, 2010, its deposits and assets were seized by the Federal Deposit Insurance Corporation (FDIC).

Subsidiaries
 Eurobank Puerto Rico
 Euromortgage
 Euroleasing
 EuroSeguros

Competitors (in Puerto Rico)
 Banco Bilbao Vizcaya Argentaria
 Banco Popular de Puerto Rico
 Banco Santander
 Citibank
 Doral Bank
 FirstBank
 Oriental Financial Group, Inc.
 RG Premier Bank
 Scotiabank
 Westernbank

References

Banks of Puerto Rico
Companies based in San Juan, Puerto Rico
Banks disestablished in 2010
Bank failures
Defunct banks of the United States
Defunct companies of Puerto Rico
Banks established in 1979
1979 establishments in Puerto Rico
2010 disestablishments in Puerto Rico